In a Fourier transformation (FT), the Fourier transformed function  is obtained from  by:

An indirect Fourier transform (IFT) is a solution to this problem.

Indirect Fourier transformation in small-angle scattering 

The sample is orientational averaged (denoted by ), and the Debye equation  can thus be exploited to simplify the relations by

In 1977 Glatter proposed an IFT method to obtain  form , and three years later, Moore introduced an alternative method. Others have later introduced alternative methods for IFT, and automatised the process

The Glatter method of IFT
This is an brief outline of the method introduced by Otto Glatter. For simplicity, we use  in the following.

In indirect Fourier transformation, a guess on the largest distance in the particle  is given, and an initial distance distribution function  is expressed as a sum of  cubic spline functions  evenly distributed on the interval (0,):

where  are scalar coefficients.

where  is given as:

The 's are unchanged under the linear Fourier transformation and can be fitted to data, thereby obtaining the coefficients . Inserting these new coefficients into the expression for  gives a final .

The fitting problem is ill posed and a very oscillating function would give the lowest  despite being physically unrealistic. Therefore, a smoothness function  is introduced:

.

The larger the oscillations, the higher . Instead of minimizing , the Lagrangian  is minimized, where the Lagrange multiplier  is denoted the smoothness parameter. 
The method is indirect in the sense that the FT is done in several steps: .

See also
 Frequency spectrum
 Least-squares spectral analysis

References

Fourier analysis